Source Tags & Codes is the third album by American rock band ...And You Will Know Us by the Trail of Dead and the first distributed by a major record label. It was released on February 26, 2002 to wide critical acclaim. The album is often cited as the band's finest work, though the band continues to deny it to this day, claiming that their best album "is the one they're currently working on".

Music videos were produced for "Another Morning Stoner" and "Relative Ways", which saw airplay on MTV2.

Recording and production
After releasing two albums on indie record imprints, Trail of Dead signed a multi-release deal with Interscope Records and began recording a follow-up to 1999's Madonna with the same producer, Mike McCarthy. Their major label budget improved recording quality and allowed intricate orchestral pieces, yielding a sound texture unlike previous records. Source Tags & Codes was recorded in Cotati, California and mixed in Nashville, Tennessee on a budget of 150,000 dollars.

Music
The song 'Baudelaire' refers to the French poet, Charles Baudelaire, and 'Days of Being Wild' is named after the Hong Kong film of the same name. "After the Laughter" samples the song "Someday (You'll Want Me to Want You)". The song "Homage" is a homage to Unwound. On the day "Homage" was recorded, producer Mike McCarthey woke Keely up that morning by throwing cold water in his face for him to be aggressive enough to record the drum track.

In the song "It Was There That I Saw You": "Keely had intended to conjure up the intoxicating thrill of living in Austin Texas in the mid-nineties, before America had gone to shit. The inspiration came from a girl he used to work with that he had a crush on, and several late nights spent in the company of people on drugs" 

The title of "Another Morning Stoner" refers to getting an erection in the morning or smoking marijuana. The song is inspired by Keely-s relationship with his ex-girlfriend who was raised Christian. "It recalls a moral dilemma he underwent when he realized that eventually theology would drive them apart more than anything else, because of his strong negative feelings towards organized religion."

Critical reception

Source Tags & Codes was met with critical acclaim, receiving a score of 85 out of 100 on review aggregate site Metacritic, indicating "universal acclaim". The Austin Chronicles Michael Chamy called Source Tags & Codes "an album that absolutely cannot be ignored", while Billboards Annie Zaleski stated that "what makes Source Tags & Codes such an amazing album is how the band teeters on the edge of this implosion but always yanks its songs back from collapse at the very last second." Noel Murray of The A.V. Club wrote that the band "plays imaginative alt-rock with intense passion, and Source Tags & Codes lets the pressure build exquisitely." Noting its "angular, Sonic Youth-style guitar and earnest anger", Blenders Michael Leonard credited the album for being "more engaging than many of [the band's] post-rock peers", while Uncut similarly wrote that "compared to so many noisemongers, TOD understand that restraint enables unleashed firepower to be exhilarating and awesome." Matt LeMay of Pitchfork awarded Source Tags & Codes a perfect score and wrote that the album "will take you in, rip you to shreds, piece you together, lick your wounds clean, and send you back into the world with a concurrent sense of loss and hope," though Conrad Keely considers this rating to be "preposterous", as "it is clearly nowhere close to a perfect album".

Hobey Echlin of The Village Voice wrote that Source Tags & Codes "captures the fuzzy-math sound from too many gray-area indie bands—and it rocks hard where geezers like Mercury Rev just drift away." Mojo described the album as "not a crossover record, but invigorating." Among average reviews, Q felt that the band "has reached a point where the need for convention outweighs the joy of using guitars as weapons." In The Village Voice, Robert Christgau awarded the album a "dud" rating, indicating "a bad record whose details rarely merit further thought." While noting that "there's a fantastic EP in here somewhere", Maddy Costa of The Guardian nonetheless felt that the album "is ablaze with emotion – it roars and pulses and oozes angst – but it never inspires".

Kludge included it on their list of best albums of 2002.

By 2005, Source Tags & Codes sales had surpassed 100,000 units.

Legacy
In 2009, Source Tags & Codes was placed at number 100 in Pitchforks list of the top 200 albums of the 2000s.

In a 2011 article, the BBC's Mike Driver calls it "one of the very finest rock albums of recent history," and "a masterpiece of its time, Source Tags & Codes really does deserve to be held in as high regard as In Rainbows or Funeral, or any other critical triumph of recent history."

Track listing

"Invocation", "Life Is Elsewhere" and "Blood Rites" are not included on the North American release of the album.

Personnel
Credits adapted from the album's liner notes.
...And You Will Know Us by the Trail of Dead
Conrad Keely – lead vocals (on "It Was There That I Saw You", "Another Morning Stoner", "How Near How Far", "Relative Ways", "Source Tags & Codes" and "Blood Rites"), guitar, string arrangements, art direction, artwork
Jason Reece – lead vocals (on "Homage", "Heart in the Hand of the Matter" and "Days of Being Wild"), drums, artwork
Neil Busch – lead vocals (on "Baudelaire" and "Monsoon"), bass
Kevin Allen - guitar
Additional personnel

 David Angel – violin
 David Bryant – engineering
 John Catchings – cello
 Sharon Corbitt – management
 Gene Cornelilus – engineering
 Larry Cragg – guitar and amplifier rental
 Eric Darken – additional percussion, bells, timpani
 David Davidson – violin
 Jason D'Ottavio – management
 Connie Ellisore – violin
 Carl Gorodetsky – violin
 Traci Goudie – art direction, layout
 David Grissom – guitar and amplifier rental
 Jim Hoke – tenor saxophone, baritone saxophone, bass harmonica
 Anthony Lamarchina – cello

 Roger Lian – editing
 Jim Lightman – engineering
 Mike McCarthy – engineering, production
 James Olsen – artwork, backing vocals
 Tetsuya Otani – management, voice translation
 John Painter – string arrangements, flugelhorn, trumpet
 Jennifer Quinn – management
 Cheryle Rennick – recording
 Mooka Rennick – recording
 Leslie Richter – engineering
 Pam Sixfin – violin
 Jim Vollentine – engineering
 Howie Weinberg – mastering
 Kristen Wilkinson – viola
 King Williams – shortwave radio rental

References

External links
 ...And You Will Know Us by the Trail of Dead official website
 

2002 debut albums
...And You Will Know Us by the Trail of Dead albums
Interscope Records albums